Mehdi N. Bahadori (Persian: مهدی بهادری‌نژاد) (born 1933, Tehran) is a professor of mechanical engineering at Sharif University of Technology.  His research specialties include  solar energy applications and passive cooling of buildings.

Education
Bahadori got his Bachelor of Science degree from the University of Tehran in 1956; his Master of Science degree from the University of Wisconsin–Madison in 1959;  and his PhD from the University of Illinois at Urbana–Champaign in 1964.

Bibliography
Publications by Bahadori include:

Books

Articles

References

External links
 Mehdi Bahadori's Homepage

1933 births
Living people
Academic staff of Sharif University of Technology
Grainger College of Engineering alumni
Date of birth missing (living people)
University of Wisconsin–Madison College of Engineering alumni
University of Tehran alumni
Iranian Science and Culture Hall of Fame recipients in Engineering
Academy of Sciences of Iran members